Jipapad, officially the Municipality of Jipapad, is a 5th class municipality in the province of Eastern Samar, Philippines. According to the 2020 census, it has a population of 8,439 people.

Barangays

Jipapad is politically subdivided into 13 barangays.

 Agsaman
 Cagmanaba
 Dorillo
 Jewaran
 Mabuhay
 Magsaysay
 Barangay 1 (Poblacion)
 Barangay 2 (Poblacion)
 Barangay 3 (Poblacion)
 Barangay 4 (Poblacion)
 Recare
 Roxas
 San Roque

Demographics

Climate

Economy

References

External links
 [ Philippine Standard Geographic Code]
 Philippine Census Information
 Local Governance Performance Management System 

Municipalities of Eastern Samar